Shondrella Dupre Avery is an American actress, model and comedian. Her film roles include as LaFawnduh Lucas-Dynamite in the independent comedy Napoleon Dynamite (2004), and supporting roles in Domino (2005) and The Secret Life of Bees (2008).

Early life
Avery was born in Los Angeles, California, and grew up in South Central Los Angeles, as the oldest of 10 children. She has created a one-woman show titled "Ain't I Enough," based on her experiences growing up with her enormous family, which has aired on HBO.

She graduated from Los Angeles County High School for the Arts and studied for her Bachelor of Fine Arts degree from California State University, Los Angeles.

Career
Avery began her career as a comic, performing as a member of the improvisational comedy groups The Groundlings in Los Angeles, and The Second City in Chicago. She and her family produced four different "workout" spots for up-and-coming and seasoned comics throughout Los Angeles County, while working a corporate job. Her first big break came in 2001 during a Fourth of July celebration on Martha's Vineyard hosted by local politicians related to her high school friend. She and good friend Tony Rock (brother to Chris Rock) performed, with an overwhelming response.

From 2002 until 2005, Avery had a recurring role as Candy Taylor on the situation comedy One on One and later became a cast member on the spinoff Cuts, playing the same role. Simultaneously, she was a cast member for five seasons on the first ever all-female reality/prank television series, Girls Behaving Badly.

In movies, Avery played internet girlfriend "LaFawnduh Lucas-Dynamite" in the 2004 film Napoleon Dynamite. At the time of being cast, Avery was working as a contracts executive at the Hilton Hotels Corporation in Beverly Hills. She subsequently had supporting roles in the films Trippin' and Domino. She also appeared in Déjà Vu with Denzel Washington, in which she was directed by Tony Scott for the second time. In 2012, Avery appeared in End of Watch, starring Jake Gyllenhaal and Michael Peña. The movie was filmed in her native South Central Los Angeles, and was written and directed by Training Day writer David Ayer.

In 2007, Avery appeared in a People magazine "who wore it best" feature comparing her to Beyoncé in an H&M dress. In US magazine, she was pictured with Mena Suvari attending Carmelo Anthony's Shoe launch in 2008. She has also been seen at many of Macy Gray's concerts. Gray played Avery's twin sister in Domino. In 2010 she staged a high tea at Philippe Chow for friend Mo'Nique, also from Domino, in honour of her Oscar nomination. The day after the high tea, Mo'Nique won the Oscar for her acclaimed performance in Precious. Avery helped celebrate the win when she made an appearance on the Mo'Nique show in 2010.

Avery and her husband, who is originally from Nigeria, produced a TV pilot in 2010 in which she examines the differences between Africans and Americans, suggesting there should be a mediator explaining both sides. She describes her show as Larry David's Curb Your Enthusiasm meets The Office. Avery is in search of the right network to launch it.

Personal life
Avery's husband is Ade Kester. Avery has been linked to many philanthropic causes. She is a children's advocate, mentoring kids at "A Place Called Home" in South Central. She's also involved with the WGA Writer's Program for teens, speaking at high schools and universities. She gives time at Los Angeles children's charity Penny Lane and is a sitting board member of the Sickle Cell Disease Foundation of California;  her mother has the disease, and two of her siblings died of it. She also works with Coach Art, a charity offering free athletic and arts training to chronically ill children.

Filmography

Film and TV Movies

Television

References

External links
UPNcyclopedia bio

Living people
Actresses from Los Angeles
20th-century American actresses
21st-century American actresses
African-American actresses
American television actresses
American film actresses
California State University, Los Angeles alumni
Los Angeles County High School for the Arts alumni
20th-century African-American women
20th-century African-American people
21st-century African-American women
21st-century African-American people
Year of birth missing (living people)